The 2018 Colonial Athletic Association baseball tournament was held at Eagle Field at Veterans Memorial Park in Harrisonburg, Virginia, from May 23 through 26.  The winner of  the tournament, earned the Colonial Athletic Association's automatic bid to the 2018 NCAA Division I baseball tournament.

Entering the event, UNC Wilmington had won the most championships among active teams, with four.  James Madison and William & Mary had claimed two titles, while Delaware, Towson and fifth-year member College of Charleston each had one.  Former member East Carolina won 7 titles during their tenure in the conference.

Seeding and format
Continuing the format adopted in 2012, the top six finishers from the regular season competed in the modified double-elimination tournament.

Bracket

All-Tournament Team
The following players were named to the All-Tournament Team.

Most Valuable Player
Cole Weiss was named Tournament Most Valuable Player.  Weiss was a third baseman for UNC Wilmington.

References

Tournament
Colonial Athletic Association Baseball Tournament
Colonial Athletic Association baseball tournament
Colonial Athletic Association baseball tournament
Baseball in Virginia
College sports in Virginia
Sports competitions in Virginia
Tourist attractions in Harrisonburg, Virginia